Rantzau (1946–1971) was a French-bred racehorse that went on to be an extremely influential sire of dressage, show jumping, and event horses, and is considered to be one of the most influential stallions from the French studbook.

Background and breeding
Henri Tambareau purchased the Thoroughbred mare, Rancune, in 1943 for use as a broodmare. She had won several times on the racetrack, and came from good lines, including that of the famous jumping sire Bay Ronald.

Rantzau's sire, Foxlight, was one of the best sons of the French stallion Haras du Pin, and also had the blood of Bay Ronald in his pedigree. After a notable career at the track, Foxlight retired to stud duty where he was quite successful, producing both flat racers and steeplechasers. His racing blood included that of Foxlaw (winner of the Ascot Gold Cup and Newmarket Jockey Club Stakes) and Foxhunter (winner of the Ascot Gold Cup).

Career on the track
As a three-year-old, Rantzau raced nine races between 2,000-3,000 meters, winning two and placing in five. He was then purchased by Marcel Boussac.

Breeding career
Marcel Boussac went on to sell Rantzau to the French National Stud at Saint-Lô, and the stallion arrived at his new home in January 1951. When he first arrived, the stud inspector noted that he had: “good front extension, remarkably built through the shoulder and forearm, long haunches, this classy stallion of rare nobility also has low-placed joints and covers ground," and later said he was "high off the ground, with slightly long cannon bones and slightly straight and interiorly bony hocks; but he has a very lovely look, a good frame, good muscle tone, a well-angled should and he is well muscled."

Between 1951 and 1962, Rantzau bred 40–49 mares a year, although these numbers dropped during the second half of his breeding career. However, he covered 772 mares during his 20 years at stud, averaging 38 each year.

It was during this time that he was first recognized as a producer of jumping horses. In 1958, Rantzau was ranked 17th top showjumping producer, moving up to the 11th spot in 1962, and fifth in 1963. In 1964, Rantzau was ranked second leading producer of showjumpers, second only to the great Furioso.

In 1970, a new ranking for "best sires of dams" was published, in which Rantzau was ranked 3rd, behind Ibrahim and Furioso. The next year, the year of his death, he was placed first. Although Ibrahim took the number-one spot again in 1973, Rantzau held onto fourth place in 1980, and again managed to rank number one in 1981, ten years after his death.

Rantzau tended to produce sensitive, "difficult" horses, that were very athletic and generally excellent jumpers. Despite this reputation, riders of international calibre were interested in purchasing his offspring.

Progeny
Cor de la Bryere: the most famous of Rantzau's sons. One of the most influential stallions in Holsteiner  breeding, sired international jumpers and dressage horses, and produced 49 approved sons. His offspring are still dominating the international scene today.
Labrador C: Grand Prix show jumper
Starter: dam sire of the great Baloubet du Rouet
Medrano: International show jumper, competed for the Netherlands
Qualibet Z: International eventer, ridden by Jean-Luc Cornille, competed at the World Eventing Championships in Punchestown
Radar II: Grand Prix showjumper, ridden by Piero d’Inzeo, won internationally as a five-year-old
Nageur: International show jumper for Portugal
Pascha du Bourg: International show jumper for Spain
Osiris C
Luxeuse B
Roi du Manoir
Prince Royal
Sire du Logis
Amour de Juilley
Unic F
Beau Fixe

International showjumpers descended within four generations:
Atout d'Isigny: Silver medal at the World Championship 
Baloubet du Rouet: triple World Cup winner 
Calei Joter: Bronze medal 
Calvaro V: Olympic Silver 
Calvaro Z
Carthago Z 
Cassiana Joter: Olympic team Bronze 
Cento: Olympic team Gold 
Classic Touch: individual Olympic Gold 
Operette la Silla 
Souviens Toi III: team silver at the World Championships
Twist du Valon

Sport horse sires
1946 racehorse births
1971 racehorse deaths
Racehorses bred in France
Thoroughbred family 23